Jamalabad-e Nezamivand (also Romanized as Jamālābād-e Nez̧āmīvand and Jamālābād Nezāmīvand; also known as Jamālābād) is a village in Kalashtar Rural District, in the Central District of Rudbar County, Gilan Province, Iran. At the 2006 census, its population was 376, in 87 families.

References 

Populated places in Rudbar County